The 2021 I.ČLTK Prague Open was a professional tennis tournament played on outdoor clay courts. It was the 28th (men) and 16th (women) editions of the tournament which was part of the 2021 ATP Challenger Tour and the 2021 ITF Women's World Tennis Tour. It took place in Prague, Czech Republic from 3 to 9 May 2021.

Men's singles main-draw entrants

Seeds

1 Rankings are as of 26 April 2021.

Other entrants
The following players received wildcards into the singles main draw:
 Jiří Lehečka
 Andrew Paulson
 Michael Vrbenský

The following player received entry into the singles main draw as a special exempt:
  Renzo Olivo

The following players received entry from the qualifying draw:
 Zdeněk Kolář
 Vít Kopřiva
 Sergiy Stakhovsky
 Kacper Żuk

Women's singles main-draw entrants

Seeds

1 Rankings are as of 26 April 2021.

Other entrants
The following players received wildcards into the singles main draw:
 Nikola Bartůňková
 Ana Konjuh
 Linda Nosková
 Darja Viďmanová

The following player received entry using a protected ranking:
 Karman Thandi

The following players received entry from the qualifying draw:
 Anna Bondár
 Amanda Carreras
 Johana Marková
 Jule Niemeier
 Paula Ormaechea
 İpek Öz
 Chantal Škamlová
 Shalimar Talbi

Champions

Men's singles

 Tallon Griekspoor def.  Oscar Otte 5–7, 6–4, 6–4.

Women's singles
 Jule Niemeier def.  Dalma Gálfi, 6–4, 6–2

Men's doubles

 Marc Polmans /  Sergiy Stakhovsky def.  Ivan Sabanov /  Matej Sabanov 6–3, 6–4.

Women's doubles
 Anna Bondár /  Kimberley Zimmermann def.  Xenia Knoll /  Elena-Gabriela Ruse, 7–6(7–5), 6–2

References
 I.ČLTK Prague Open at ITFtennis.com

2021 ATP Challenger Tour
2021 ITF Women's World Tennis Tour
2021 in Czech tennis
May 2021 sports events in the Czech Republic
I.ČLTK Prague Open